This is a list of lakes in the U.S. state of West Virginia.

 Alpine Lake
 Beech Fork Lake
 Big Ditch Lake
 Bluestone Lake
 Boley Lake
 Brushy Fork Lake
 Buffalo Creek Reservoir
 Burnsville Lake
 Cheat Lake
 Conaway Run Lake
 East Lynn Lake
 Elk Fork Lake
 Lake Floyd
 Hawks Nest Lake
 Jennings Randolph Lake
 Kimsey Run Lake
 North Bend Lake
 Moncove Lake
 Mount Storm Lake
 O'Brien Lake
 Parker Hollow Lake
 Plum Orchard Lake
 R.D. Bailey Lake
 Lake Sherwood
 Sleepy Creek Lake
 Spruce Knob Lake
 Stephens Lake
 Stonecoal Lake
 Stonewall Jackson Lake
 Stony River Reservoir
 Summersville Lake
 Summit Lake
 Sutton Lake
 Trout Pond
 Tygart Lake
 Upper Mud Lake
 Warden Lake
 Woodrum Lake

See also

List of lakes

 
Lakes in West Virginia, List of
West Virginia